Matira Manisha (Man of the Soil) is a 1966 Odia film directed by Mrinal Sen.

Based on the novel by Kalindi Charan Panigrahi of the same name, the film contrasts traditional and modern values as exemplified by the different attitudes of two brothers towards their inherited family land. The plot explores human relationships using a wide range of themes, including Gandhian and Marxist ideologies, postwar social conditions, agrarian culture, rustic life, and traditional family values.

Synopsis 
The plot revolves round the family of Shama Pradhan, a rural farmer, and his two sons, Baraju (played by Sarat Pujari) and Chakadi (played by Prashanta Nanda), and disagreements over the family home and land after his death.

On his death, Shama Pradhan entrusts his elder son Baraju with the responsibility of looking after his younger son Chakadi, and entreats him to keep the family land and home together, and not split it between the two brothers. Baraju is a peace-loving person who commands respect from the villagers for his idealistic way of life, and Baraju's wife Harabou (played by Bhanumati Devi) is portrayed as an ideal housewife, who is very caring and affectionate towards Chakadi, his wife Netramani (played by Sujata Anand) and their two children.

Chakadi, in contrast, is shown as carefree and irresponsible, happy to loaf around the village. His wife, Netramani, who is envious of Harabou, insists that the property should be split between the two brothers. A local troublemaker, Hari Mishra (played by Dukhiram Swain), also tries to sow discord between the two brothers.

Swayed by the designs of his wife Netramani, and of troublemaker Hari Mishra, Chakadi asks his elder brother to divide the property between them. Baraju is shocked, and is torn between his respect for his father's wishes and his affection for his brother. His solution is to hand over the land and the house to Chakadi, satisfying Chakadi's desire, while respecting his promise to his father not to partition the property. Baraju leaves the house with his wife Harabou and their two children, without regret or rancour.

After Baraju's departure, Chakadi feels miserable, is nostalgic about the old times, and wants his brother and family back. He goes to Baraju and begs him to return home. But Baraju, who is committed to the spirit of sacrifice, non-attachment, and love, advises Chakadi to go back home and take care of all that he has left behind.

Cast
Sarat Pujari as Baraju
Prashanta Nanda as Chakadi
Bhanumati Devi as Harabou
Dukhiram Swain as Hari Mishra
Sujata Anand as Netramani
Ram Manya
Kartick Ghosh
Bhim Singh
Snehalata
Meeta
Aloka Kanungo

Crew
Producer - Babulal Doshi
Director  - Mrinal Sen
Story	- Kalindi Charan Panigrahi
Screanplay & Dialogue - Gopal Chhotaray
Camera	- Sailaja Chatterjee
Music - Bhubaneswar Mishra
Director Of Photography - Sailaja Chatterjee
Editor - Gangadhar Naskar
Art Direction - B. Kalyan

Awards 
National Film Awards 1967 (Silver Lotus for Best Odia film)

Music 
Rama Bibha Ghare Ho Lakhmana Bara Jaatri (sung by Akshaya Mohanty)
Udigale Gendalia Jhadidele Para (sung by Akshaya Mohanty)

References

External links

Review of 'Matira Manisha' in www.citwf.com
Review of 'Matira Manisha' in movies.msn.com
Review of 'Matira Manisha' in www.showbizdata.com

1966 films
Films directed by Mrinal Sen
1960s Odia-language films